Corpo Estraneo (Foreign Body) is the twenty-ninth album by the band Nomadi. There were three singles released from the album: Oriente, which a video was filmed for, Corpo Estraneo, and In Piedi. The album was certified platinum just from its presales.

Personnel
 Beppe Carletti: Keyboards
 Cico Falzone: Guitar
 Daniele Campani: Drums
 Danilo Sacco: Voice and Guitar
 Massimo Vecchi: Bass and Voice
 Sergio Reggioli: Percussion and Violin

Track listing
 L'ordine dall'alto   (4' 15")
 Oriente   (4' 42")
 Essere o non essere   (4' 11")
 In piedi   (4' 36")
 Stella cieca   (3' 36")
 Confesso   (3' 24")
 Corpo estraneo   (4' 10")
 Stringi i pugni   (4' 40")
 Vulcani   (4' 22")
 Soldato   (4' 39")
 La voce dell'amore   (4' 24")

2004 albums
Nomadi albums